The 2021 IBSF European Championships were held from 8 to 10 January 2021 in Winterberg, Germany. IBSF European Championships is the European Championships for bobsleigh and skeleton.

Medal summary

Medal table

Bobsleigh

Skeleton

See also
IBSF World Championships 2021
IBSF Junior World Championships 2021

References

European Championships
European Championships
2021 in German sport
International sports competitions hosted by Germany
Skeleton in Germany
Bobsleigh in Germany
January 2021 sports events in Germany
Bobsleigh competitions
Skeleton competitions